The Taiwan Livestock Research Institute (TLRI) is a research center in Xinhua District, Tainan, Taiwan. It conducts research on animal breeding, physiology, nutrition and feeding techniques, animal waste treatment and utilization of byproducts, animal product processing, and forage crops. The institute has cloned pigs, goats, and cows.

History
The TLRI was established as a horse-breeding farm in 1940 by the Japanese government. Between 1945 and 1952, it was a horse farm under the supervision of Taiwan Provincial Government. In 1952, it was named to Hsinhua Livestock Research Branch Institute. In 1958, it was reorganized as Taiwan Livestock Research Institute under the Provincial Department of Agriculture and Forestry. It is now a unit of the central government's Council of Agriculture since 1999.

Organizational structures
 Animal Industry Division
 Animal Products Processing Division
 Breeding and Genetics Division
 Forage Crops Division
 Livestock Management Division
 Nutrition Division
 Physiology Division
 Technical Service Division

References

1940 establishments in Taiwan
Agricultural research institutes in Taiwan
Animal breeding organizations
Livestock